Ji Min-ji (Hangul: 지민지; born March 4, 1999) is a South Korean figure skater who currently competes in ladies' singles and pair skating. With partner Themistocles Leftheris, she is a two-time (2016, 2017) South Korean national champion and competed in the free skate at the 2017 Four Continents Championships. They teamed up in 2015.

Programs
(with Leftheris)

Competitive highlights 
GP: Grand Prix; CS: Challenger Series

Pairs with Leftheris

Ladies' singles

References

External links 
 

South Korean female pair skaters
Living people
1999 births